The Case Against Education: Why the Education System Is a Waste of Time and Money is a book written by libertarian economist Bryan Caplan and published in 2018 by Princeton University Press. Drawing on the economic concept of job market signaling and research in educational psychology, the book argues that much of higher education is very inefficient and has only a small effect in improving human capital, contrary to the conventional consensus in labor economics.

Caplan argues that the primary function of education is not to enhance students' skills but to certify their intelligence, conscientiousness, and conformity—attributes that are valued by employers. He ultimately estimates that approximately 80% of individuals' return to education is the result of signaling, with the remainder due to human capital accumulation.

Summary

Human capital model
The foundation of the drive to increase educational attainment across the board is the human capital model of education, which began with the research of Gary Becker. The model suggests that increasing educational attainment causes increased prosperity by endowing students with increased skills. As a consequence, subsidies to education are seen as a positive investment that increases economic growth and creates spillover effects by improving civic engagement, happiness, health, etc.

Present value of learning, adjusted for forgetting
The simple human capital model tends to assume that knowledge is retained indefinitely, while a ubiquitous theme in educational interventions is that "fadeout" (i.e., forgetting) reliably occurs. But this is at odds with the concept of fadeout. To correct for this, assume that the probability density function for retaining  follows an exponential distribution—with the corresponding survival function . Below is a table showing what the present value is based on and the expected retention time of the fact:

Regardless of the retention time assumption, the present value of learning  is significantly reduced.

Signaling model
The main alternative to the human capital model of education is the signaling model of education. The idea of job market signaling through educational attainment goes back to the work of Michael Spence. The model Spence developed suggested that, even if a student did not gain any skills through an educational program, the program can still be useful so long as the signal from completing the program is correlated with traits that predict job performance.

Throughout the book, Caplan details a series of observations that suggest a significant role for signaling in the return to education:
 Intelligence and conscientiousness are known predictors of educational and occupational success, and are relatively stable throughout a person's life
 International estimates of the effect of an additional year of education on national income are much lower than those estimating the impact of an additional year of education on personal income (p. 114-118)
 Many students forget material over the summer and after the end of a class (p. 39-40)
 Adults tend to forget much of the information they learned in school (p. 39-50). This builds on Caplan's earlier book The Myth of the Rational Voter.
 Students look to take courses that offer easy As, instead of more difficult courses
 The sheepskin effect seems to be fairly large (p. 97-102)
 Transfer of learning to other disciplines appears to be low or nonexistent (p. 50-59)

Given the above signs of signaling, Caplan argues in ch. 5–6 that the selfish return to education is greater than the social return to education, suggesting that greater educational attainment creates a negative externality (p. 198). In other words, status is zero-sum; skill is not (p. 229).

Cost-benefit analysis of going to college
For many students, Caplan argues that most of the negative social return to pursuing further education comes from the incursion of student debt and lost employment opportunities for students who are unlikely to complete college (p. 210-211, ch. 8). He suggests that these students would be better served by vocational education.

Policy recommendations
Caplan advocates two major policy responses to the problem of signaling in education:

 Educational austerity
 Increased vocational education

The first recommendation is that government needs to sharply cut education funding, since public education spending in the United States across all levels tops $1 trillion annually. The second recommendation is to encourage greater vocational education, because students who are unlikely to succeed in college should develop practical skills to function in the labor market. Caplan argues for an increased emphasis on vocational education that is similar in nature to the systems in Germany and Switzerland.

Reviews

Positive
 Robin Hanson at Overcoming Bias
 Naomi Schaefer Riley in The Wall Street Journal
 Gene Epstein in City Journal

Mixed
 Stephen L. Carter in Bloomberg Opinion
 "I'm not sure he's right, especially about education being almost entirely for the purpose of signaling, but goodness does he make a strong case. Agree with him or not, you'll never look at the schools and colleges in quite the same way."
 Tyler Cowen in Marginal Revolution
 Ilya Somin at Reason

Negative
 Sarah Carr in The Washington Post
 Sean Illing at Vox
 Joshua Kim at Inside Higher Ed

See also
 Big Five personality traits
 Credential inflation
 Grade inflation
 Education economics
 Intelligence
 Labor economics

References

Further reading
 Becker, Gary S. (1964). Human Capital: A Theoretical and Empirical Analysis, with Special Reference to Education (3rd ed.). Chicago, IL: University of Chicago Press. .
 Bolton, Patrick; Dewatripont, Mathias (2005). Contract Theory. Cambridge, MA: The MIT Press. pp. 99–127. .
 Cahuc, Pierre; Carcillo, Stéphane; Zylberberg, André (2014). Labor Economics (2nd ed.). Cambridge, MA: The MIT Press. pp. 191–245. .
 Bahrick, Harry P.; Hall, Lynda K. (1991). "Lifetime Maintenance of High School Mathematics Content". Journal of Experimental Psychology: General, 120 (1): 20–33.

External links
 Noah Blaylock's Study Guide to The Case Against Education

Asymmetric information
Economics books
Education economics
Labour economics